Pooles Island is a small island located on the Chesapeake Bay, part of Harford County, Maryland. It is southeast of the southern tip of Gunpowder Neck. The Pooles Island Light was built on it. Pooles Island was used for bombing practice from 1918 through the 1960s as part of Aberdeen Proving Ground. Access to the island is prohibited due to unexploded ordnance.

Poole's Island was first occupied by Native Americans. The shell middens on the island were evidence of their presense. It was first sighted by Europeans in 1608 wshen Captain John Smith explored the Chesapeake. He named it after Nathanial Powell, a member of his party. Over the years the name evolved from "Powell's Island" to "Poole's Island".

In 1855 Two watermen Capt. Elijah Williams and Capt. James Williams, were lost in a storm. Their bodies washed ashore on the island. They were buried by the lighthouse keeper.

References

Landforms of Harford County, Maryland
Uninhabited islands of Maryland
River islands of Maryland
Maryland islands of the Chesapeake Bay